Kidman may refer to:

People
 Antonia Kidman (born 1970), Australian journalist, daughter of Antony Kidman
 Antony Kidman (1938–2014), Australian biochemist and psychologist
 Fiona Kidman (born 1940), New Zealand novelist, poet, and scriptwriter
 Jens Kidman (born 1966), Swedish musician and vocalist
 Nicole Kidman (born 1967), Australian actress, daughter of Antony Kidman
 Sidney Kidman (1857–1935), Australian pastoralist who owned more than 3% of territory of Australia
 Billy Kidman (born 1974), or Kidman, ring names of American professional wrestler Peter Gruner

Other uses
 Kidman Park, Adelaide, South Australia
 Kidman Way, State Highway 87 in New South Wales, Australia, named for Sidney Kidman